Eteia or Etea was a town of ancient Crete. Pliny the Elder places it between Phalasarna and Cisamus (although some manuscripts have the town name as Elea or Eleae (Ἤλεα or Ἤλεαι). Euthyphro claims that Myson of Chenae was a native of the town.

The site of Eteia is unlocated.

References

Populated places in ancient Crete
Former populated places in Greece
Lost ancient cities and towns